S. Sankar Muthusamy Subramanian (born 13 January 2004) is an Indian badminton player. He is a former world junior number 1 in the boys' singles. At the age of 17, he reached the finals of the senior tournament the 2021 Uganda International. Subramanian won the silver medal at the 2022 World Junior Championships.

Achievements

World Junior Championships 
Boys' singles

BWF International Challenge/Series (1 runner-up) 
Men's singles

  BWF International Challenge tournament
  BWF International Series tournament
  BWF Future Series tournament

BWF Junior International (2 titles) 
Boys' singles

  BWF Junior International Grand Prix tournament
  BWF Junior International Challenge tournament
  BWF Junior International Series tournament
  BWF Junior Future Series tournament

References

External links 

Living people
2004 births
Racket sportspeople from Chennai
Indian male badminton players
21st-century Indian people